Emmanuel Curtil (born 7 February 1971) is a French actor known primarily for his voice work, having dubbed the voice of Matthew Perry (Chandler) for the first eight seasons of the American sitcom Friends. Curtil is also the "French voice" of Jim Carrey. He is also the current voice of Goofy, assuming that duty from Gérard Rinaldi, who died in 2012.

Biography
At the age of nine, Curtil's mother (an artistic agent) encouraged him to enter Cours Simon, a theatrical training program in Paris for children. At that time, he wanted to be a singer, then an impressionist, but his mother, knowing that show business was a difficult field but also certain of her son's potential, steered him toward acting. Thus at 10 years old he made his début in L'Oiseau bleu, a made-for-TV movie directed by Gabriel Axel. This caught the attention of director Robert Hossein, who cast Curtil as Gavroche in an adaptation of Les Misérables, which aired as a miniseries on French TV in 1982.

Next he played Paul in the musical comedy Paul et Virginie directed by Jean-Jacques Debout. In 1983, Curtil landed the role of Stéphane in the film Vive les femmes! directed by Claude Confortès. He also counts in his record of professional achievements numerous roles in television series like Pause-café and Tribunal, a daily episodic program. However, that type of production is very tricky because economic constraints require shooting two episodes a day, and do not allow rehearsals; the actors must therefore spit out lines learned by heart the night before. His artistic development stagnating, Curtil henceforth avoided that type of series. While he had taken singing lessons at the start of his career, they did not serve him well because his teacher had given him lyrics poorly adapted to his baritone voice and to his profession.

But Curtil's entry into the field of dubbing did not occur until Barbara Tissier (whose dubbing credits include the voice of Soleil Moon Frye on Punky Brewster and Christina Applegate on Married... with Children) advised him to audition at SOFI, a dubbing agency that was looking for "young" voices. Curtil was chosen immediately. At that time the field was booming, with the upsurge of private networks that broadcast primarily foreign series dubbed into French. Thus began Curtil's grand career in dubbing (although he had occasionally had to redub his own lines in the past because of technical issues).

Curtil dubbed Mark-Paul Gosselaar in Saved by the Bell, then Dean Cain in Lois and Clark, Kyle Chandler in Early Edition, Doug Savant in Melrose Place, and above all Matthew Perry in Friends. At present, Curtil voices Doug Savant playing Tom Scavo in Desperate Housewives.

Curtil first dubbed Jim Carrey in The Mask. An important casting call was organized, and the distributor chose Curtil, who has been the "official voice" of Carrey in France ever since.

In animated features film, he voiced Simba in Disney's Le Roi Lion and Moses in the 1998 DreamWorks film Le Prince d'Égypte.

He dubbed the characters' singing voice as well as their speaking voice, for example in Anastasia and The Lion King, as well as in a musical episode of Buffy contre les vampires where he interpreted the singing voice of Giles.

In 1998, Curtil started to take piano lessons, focusing his studies on a classical repertoire. When time permits, he devotes himself to reading and listens to a lot of music. He has a wife and one son.

Stage
 Paul et Virginie (1992) directed by Jean-Jacques Debout at Théâtre de Paris   
 Jack and the Beanstalk (2005) directed by Oscar Sisto at Théâtre du Temple
 Rutabaga Swing (2006) directed by Philippe Ogouz at Théâtre des Champs-Élysées

Selected voice acting on television
 Voice of Chandler Bing (actor Matthew Perry) in Friends (season 1–8)
 Voice of Clark Kent/Superman (actor Dean Cain) in Lois et Clark
 Voice of Barry Dylan in the sitcom Archer
 Voice of Gary Hobson (actor Kyle Chandler) in Demain à la une
 Voice of Benton Fraser (actor Paul Gross) in Un tandem de choc
 Voice of Zack Morris (actor Mark-Paul Gosselaar) in Sauvés par le gong
 Voice of Dennis Sweeny (actor Mark-Paul Gosselaar) in Hyperion Bay
 Voice of Kevin Wyat (actor Antonio Sabato, Jr.) in Ally McBeal
 Voice of Bane (actor Antonio Sabato, Jr.) in Charmed
 Voice of Chance Harper (actor D. B. Sweeney) in Drôle de chance
 Voice of Matt Fielding (actor Doug Savant) in Melrose Place
 Voice of Craig Phillips (actor Doug Savant) in 24 heures chrono
 Voice of Tom Scavo (actor Doug Savant) in Desperate Housewives
 Voice of Josh Walter (actor Doug Savant) in La croisière s'amuse, nouvelle vague
 Voice of Leroy Johnson (actor Gene Anthony Ray) in Fame
 Voice of Tommy (actor Michael Worth) in Agence Acapulco
 Voice of David Fisher (actor Michael C. Hall) in Six Feet Under
 Voice of Daggett in The Angry Beavers
 Voice of Frank Murphy in F is for Family (season 3-5)
 Voice of Thomas Lancaster Dubois in The Boondocks
 Voice of Tobias Curtis (actor Eddy Kaye Thomas) in Scorpion
 Voice of Ed Mercer (actor Seth MacFarlane) in The Orville
 Voice of Jeff Pickles (actor Jim Carrey) in Kidding
 Voice of Stanley Ipkiss/The Mask in The Mask: Animated Series

Selected voice acting in film
 Adult Simba (originally voiced by Matthew Broderick) in Le Roi lion
 Jim Carrey in almost all of his films, except Batman Forever, and The Number 23
 Moses (originally voiced by Val Kilmer) in Le Prince d'Égypte
 Raoul Duke/Hunter S. Thompson (actor Johnny Depp) in Las Vegas Parano
  Dimitri (originally voiced by John Cusack) in Anastasia
 Garret in Quest for Camelot
 Buck in Ice Age: Dawn of the Dinosaurs and Ice Age: Collision Course
 Zucchini in Mune: Guardian of the Moon (2014)
 Kronk in The Emperor's New Groove and Kronk's New Groove
 Surly in The Nut Job
 Mike Myers in The Cat in the Hat
 The Toucan in Encanto

References
Much of the content in this article comes from the equivalent article in the French Wikipédia, accessed June 3, 2006.

External links
 
 Official Site of Emmanuel Curtil
  Une interview du comédien
  Une autre interview, portée principalement sur la série Friends

1971 births
Living people
French male stage actors
French male voice actors
People from Charenton-le-Pont
Male actors from Paris